Thomas M. Fagan (March 1882 — November 1931) was an American politician from Lusk, Wyoming who served a single term in the Wyoming House of Representatives, representing Niobrara County from 1925 to 1927 as a Democrat in the 18th Wyoming Legislature.

Early life
Fagan was born in Monroe County, Iowa in March of 1882.

Career
Fagan was elected to the Wyoming House of Representatives to represent Niobrara County from 1925 to 1927 as a Democrat in the 18th Wyoming Legislature. Fagan represented Niobrara County alongside William Jack.

Personal life and death
Fagan was married to Josephine Fagan, who also served in the Wyoming House of Representatives. She was elected in 1932, and represented Niobrara County from 1933 to 1935 as a Democrat in the 22nd legislature.

In November of 1931, Fagan died at his home in Lusk, Wyoming at the age of 49.

See also
Josephine Fagan, Fagan's wife, who also represented Niobrara County as a Democrat in the Wyoming House of Representatives

Notes

References

External links
Official page at the Wyoming Legislature

1882 births
1931 deaths
20th-century American politicians
Democratic Party members of the Wyoming House of Representatives
People from Lusk, Wyoming
People from Monroe County, Iowa
Date of birth missing
Date of death missing